The Sofia Soloists Chamber Orchestra (SSCO) is a chamber music ensemble based in Sofia, Bulgaria. 

SSCO was established in 1962 by a group of young musicians with the Sofia National Opera. Their first concert conducted by Michail Angelov was well-received, and shortly afterward they began a schedule of concerts and international tours.

By 2014 SSCO had completed more than 3000 concerts and have won awards from international music festivals in Germany, France, Spain, Croatia, Italy, Belgium and Norway.

References

External links
 Official Site

Musical groups established in 1962
Bulgarian orchestras
Chamber orchestras
1962 establishments in Bulgaria